The Socialist Arab Lebanon Vanguard Party (Arabic: حزب طليعة لبنان العربي الاشتراكي Hizb Al-Taliyeh Lubnan Al-'Arabi Al-Ishtiraki) is a political party in Lebanon. The party was led by Abd al-Majid al-Rafei until his death in July 2017. It is the Lebanese regional branch of the Iraqi-led Ba'ath Party. The party held its second congress in October 2011. Founders of the party included Dr. Abd al-Majid al-Rafe'ii, Jihad George Karam, Rafiq Naseeb al-Faqih,Rashid Abu flah,Karam Mohamed al-Sahili, Hani Mohammad Sho'aib, Ammar Mohammad Shibli, Hassan Khalil Gharib and Wassef El Harakeh. Although formally affiliated to the Sunni-dominated regime in Baghdad, the majority of the party's members were Lebanese Shiites.

The existence of the Lebanese branch of the Iraqi-led Ba'ath Party has much longer roots than its Syrian-led counterpart. Following the 1966 split in the Ba'ath Party between Iraqi and Syrian-dominated factions, the pro-Iraqi party was led by Abd al-Majid Rafei.

At first, the pro-Iraqi party and the pro-Syrian party worked side-by-side in the Lebanese National Movement (also known as the National Front), but with tension increasing between them, the two parties were on a war footing. The party was active in 1960s demonstrations, and al-Rafei was detained by Lebanese authorities for his political activities. However, he was a candidate from Tripoli in the 1968 general election. The party expanded during the first half of the 1970s, and in the 1972 general election al-Rafi was elected to parliament from Tripoli. Ali al-Khalil, a former member, was elected from Tyre. The party was active in southern Lebanon, and was built with generous aid from Iraq.

Lebanese Civil War 
During the Lebanese Civil War, the Lebanese parliament formed the National Dialogue Committee in 1975. Assem Qanso of the pro-Syrian party became a member, but no figures from the pro-Iraqi Ba'ath Party were given a seat on the committee. The party was a member of the Lebanese National Movement, a political alliance led by Kamal Jumblatt of the Progressive Socialist Party, and had an organized a militia of around 5000 armed men that received its funding and weapons by Iraq. 

Following the execution of  Muhammad Baqir al-Sadr by Saddam Hussein in April 1980, the party came into conflict with Amal Movement, which culminated in tit-for-tat assassinations and clashes in Shia majority suburbs of Dahieh until late 1981. In November 1981, Tahsein al-Atrash, leader of the Ba'ath branch at the time, was shot dead.

See also
Arab Socialist Ba'ath Party – Lebanon Region
Lebanese Civil War
Lebanese National Movement

References

1966 establishments in Lebanon
Arab nationalism in Lebanon
Arab nationalist militant groups
Ba'athist parties
Lebanon
Factions in the Lebanese Civil War
Lebanese National Movement
Nationalist parties in Lebanon
Political parties established in 1966
Socialist parties in Lebanon